Nubians (Nobiin: Nobī) are an ethnic group indigenous to the region which is now northern Sudan and southern Egypt. They originate from the early inhabitants of the central Nile valley, believed to be one of the earliest cradles of civilization. In the southern valley of Egypt, Nubians differ culturally and ethnically from other Egyptians, although they intermarried with members of other ethnic groups, especially Arabs. They speak Nubian languages as a mother tongue, part of the Northern Eastern Sudanic languages, and Arabic as a second language.

Early Neolithic settlements have been found in the central Nubian region dating back to 7000 BC, with Wadi Halfa believed to be the oldest settlement in the central Nile valley. Parts of Nubia, particularly Lower Nubia, were at times a part of ancient Pharaonic Egypt and at other times a rival state representing parts of Meroë or the Kingdom of Kush. By the Twenty-fifth Dynasty (744 BC–656 BC), all of Egypt was united with Nubia, extending down to what is now Khartoum. However, In 656 BC the native Twenty-sixth Dynasty regained control of Egypt. As warriors, the ancient Nubians were famous for their skill and precision with the bow and arrow. In the Middle Ages, the Nubians converted to Christianity and established three kingdoms: Nobatia in the north, Makuria in the center, and Alodia in the south. They then converted to Islam during the Islamization of the Sudan region.

Today, Nubians in Egypt primarily live in southern Egypt, especially in Kom Ombo and Nasr al-nuba north of Aswan, and large cities such as Cairo, while Sudanese Nubians live in northern Sudan, particularly in the region between the city of Wadi Halfa on the Egypt–Sudan border and al Dabbah. Some Nubians migrated to Khashm el Girba and New Halfa.
Additionally, a group known as the Midob live in northern Darfur, a group named Birgid in Central Darfur and several groups known as the Hill Nubians who live in Northern Kordofan in Haraza and a few villages in the northern Nuba Mountains in South Kordofan state, Sudan. The main Nubian groups from north to south are the Kenzi (Nobiin: Matōki), Faadicha (Halfawi) (Nobiin: Fadīja), Sukkot, Mahas (Nobiin: Mahássi), and Danagla. There also exist two large tribes of fully arabized Nubians who inhabit Northern Sudan - these groups are known as the Shaigiya (Nobiin: Šaigē) and Ja'alin.

Etymology
Throughout history various parts of Nubia were known by different names, including  "Land of the Bow", tꜣ nḥsj, jꜣm "Kerma", jrṯt, sṯjw, wꜣwꜣt, Meroitic: akin(e) «Lower "Nubia"» and qes(a), qos(a) "Kush", and Greek Aethiopia. The origin of the names Nubia and Nubian are contested. What is more certain is that they ultimately denote geographical provenance rather than ethnic origin. Based on cultural traits, many scholars believe Nubia is derived from the  "gold". The Roman Empire used the term "Nubia" to describe the area of Upper Egypt and northern Sudan. Another etymology traces the toponym to a distinct group of people, the Noubai, who in more recent times inhabited the area that would become known as Nubia. The derivation of the term "Nubian" has also been associated with the Greek historian Strabo, who referred to the Nubas people.

History

The prehistory of Nubia dates to the Paleolithic around 300,000 years ago. By about 6000 BC, peoples in the region had developed an agricultural economy. They began using a system of writing relatively late in their history, when they adopted the Egyptian hieroglyphic system. Ancient history in Nubia is categorized according to the following periods: A-Group culture (3700–2800 BC), C-Group culture (2300–1600), Kerma culture (2500–1500), Nubian contemporaries of the New Kingdom (1550–1069), the Twenty-fifth Dynasty (1000–653), Napata (1000–275), Meroë (275 BC–300/350 AD), Makuria (340–1317), Nobatia (350–650), and Alodia (600s–1504).

Archaeological evidence has attested that population settlements occurred in Nubia as early as the Late Pleistocene era and from the 5th millennium BC onwards, whereas there is "no or scanty evidence" of human presence in the Egyptian Nile Valley during these periods, which may be due to problems in site preservation.

Several scholars have argued that the African origins of the Egyptian civilisation derived from pastoral communities which emerged in both the Egyptian and Sudanese regions of the Nile Valley in the fifth millennium BCE.

Various biological anthropological studies have shown strong biological affinities between the predynastic Egyptian and early Nubian populations.

The linguistic affinities of early Nubian cultures are uncertain. Some research has suggested that the early inhabitants of the Nubia region, during the C-Group and Kerma cultures, were speakers of languages belonging to the Berber and Cushitic branches, respectively, of the Afroasiatic family. More recent research instead suggests that the people of the Kerma culture spoke Nilo-Saharan languages of the Eastern Sudanic branch and that the peoples of the C-Group culture to their north spoke Cushitic languages. They were succeeded by the first Nubian language speakers, whose tongues belonged to another branch of Eastern Sudanic languages within the Nilo-Saharan phylum. A 4th-century victory stela commemorative of Axumite king Ezana contains inscriptions describing two distinct population groups dwelling in ancient Nubia: a "red" population and a "black" population.

Although Egypt and Nubia have a shared pre-dynastic and pharaonic history, the two histories diverge with the fall of Ancient Egypt and the conquest of Egypt by Alexander the Great in 332 BC. At this point, the area of land between the 1st and the 6th cataract of the Nile became known as Nubia.

Egypt was conquered first by the Persians and named the Satrapy (Province) of Mudriya, and two centuries later by the Greeks and then the Romans. During the latter period, however, the Kushites formed the kingdom of Meroë, which was ruled by a series of legendary Candaces or Queens. Mythically, the Candace of Meroë was able to intimidate Alexander the Great into retreat with a great army of elephants, while historical documents suggest that the Nubians defeated the Roman Emperor Augustus Caesar, resulting in a favorable peace treaty for Meroë. The kingdom of Meroë also defeated the Persians, and later Christian Nubia defeated the invading Arab armies on three different occasions resulting in the 600 year peace treaty of Baqt, the longest lasting treaty in history. The fall of the kingdom of Christian Nubia occurred in the early 1500s resulting in full Islamization and reunification with Egypt under the Ottoman Empire, the Muhammad Ali dynasty, and British colonial rule. After the 1956 independence of Sudan from Egypt, Nubia and the Nubian people became divided between Southern Egypt and Northern Sudan.

Modern Nubians speak Nubian languages, Eastern Sudanic languages that is part of the Nilo-Saharan family. The Old Nubian language is attested from the 8th century, and is the oldest recorded language of Africa outside of the Afroasiatic family. It was the language of the Noba nomads who occupied the Nile between the First and Third Cataracts and also of the Makorae nomads who occupied the land between the Third and Fourth Cataracts, following the collapse of the Kingdom of Kush sometime in the fourth century. The Makorae were a separate tribe who eventually conquered or inherited the lands of the Noba: they established a Byzantine-influenced state called the Makuria, which administered the Noba lands separately as the eparchy of Nobatia. Nobadia was converted to Miaphysitism by the Orthodox priest Julian and Longinus of Constantinople, and thereafter received its bishops from the Pope of the Coptic Orthodox Church of Alexandria.

Nubia consisted of four regions with varied agriculture and landscapes. The Nile river and its valley were found in the north and central parts of Nubia, allowing farming using irrigation. The western Sudan had a mixture of peasant agriculture and nomadism. Eastern Sudan had primarily nomadism, with a few areas of irrigation and agriculture. Finally, there was the fertile pastoral region of the south, where Nubia's larger agricultural communities were located.

Nubia was dominated by kings from clans that controlled the gold mines. Trade in exotic goods from other parts of Africa (ivory, animal skins) passed to Egypt through Nubia.

Language
Modern Nubians speak Nubian languages. They belong to the Eastern Sudanic branch of the Nilo-Saharan phylum. But there is some uncertainty regarding the classification of the languages spoken in Nubia in antiquity. There is some evidence that Cushitic languages were spoken in parts of Lower (northern) Nubia, an ancient region which straddles present-day Southern Egypt and Northern Sudan, and that Eastern Sudanic languages were spoken in Upper and Central Nubia, before the spread of Eastern Sudanic languages even further north into Lower Nubia.

Peter Behrens (1981) and Marianne Bechhaus-Gerst (2000) suggest that the ancient peoples of the C-Group and Kerma civilizations spoke Afroasiatic languages of the Berber and Cushitic branches, respectively. They propose that the Nilo-Saharan Nobiin language today contains a number of key pastoralism related loanwords that are of Berber or proto-Highland East Cushitic origin, including the terms for sheep/goatskin, hen/cock, livestock enclosure, butter and milk. This in turn, is interpreted to suggest that the C-Group and Kerma populations, who inhabited the Nile Valley immediately before the arrival of the first Nubian speakers, spoke Afroasiatic languages.

Claude Rilly (2010, 2016) and Julien Cooper (2017) on the other hand, suggest that the Kerma peoples (of Upper Nubia) spoke Nilo-Saharan languages of the Eastern Sudanic branch, possibly ancestral to the later Meroitic language, which Rilly also suggests was Nilo-Saharan. Rilly also considers evidence of significant early Afro-Asiatic influence, especially Berber, on Nobiin to be weak (and where present, more likely due to borrowed loanwords than substrata), and considers evidence of substratal influence on Nobiin from an earlier now extinct Eastern Sudanic language to be stronger.
Julien Cooper (2017) suggests that Nilo-Saharan languages of the Eastern Sudan branch were spoken by the people of Kerma, those further south along the Nile, to the west, and those of Saï (an island to the north of Kerma), but that Afro-Asiatic (most likely Cushitic) languages were spoken by other peoples in Lower Nubia (such as the Medjay and the C-Group culture) living in Nubian regions north of Saï toward Egypt and those southeast of the Nile in Punt in the Eastern dessert. Based partly on an analysis of the phonology of place names and personal names from the relevant regions preserved in ancient texts, he argues that the terms from "Kush" and "Irem" (ancient names for Kerma and the region south of it respectively) in Egyptian texts display traits typical of Eastern Sudanic languages, while those from further north (in Lower Nubia) and east are more typical of the Afro-Asiatic family, noting: "The Irem-list also provides a similar inventory to Kush, placing this firmly in an Eastern Sudanic zone. These Irem/Kush-lists are distinctive from the Wawat-, Medjay-, Punt-, and Wetenet-lists, which provide sounds typical to Afroasiatic languages."

It is also uncertain to which language family the ancient Meroitic language is related. Kirsty Rowan suggests that Meroitic, like the Egyptian language, belongs to the Afroasiatic family. She bases this on its sound inventory and phonotactics, which, she argues, are similar to those of the Afroasiatic languages and dissimilar from those of the Nilo-Saharan languages. Claude Rilly proposes, based on its syntax, morphology, and known vocabulary, that Meroitic, like the Nobiin language, belongs to the Eastern Sudanic branch of the Nilo-Saharan family.

Modern Nubians

The descendants of the ancient Nubians still inhabit the general area of what was ancient Nubia. They currently live in what is called Old Nubia, mainly located in modern Egypt and Sudan. Nubians have been resettled in large numbers (an estimated 50,000 people) away from Wadi Halfa North Sudan in to Khashm el Girba - Sudan and some moved to Southern Egypt since the 1960s, when the Aswan High Dam was built on the Nile, flooding ancestral lands. Most Nubians nowadays work in Egyptian and Sudanese cities. Whereas Arabic was once only learned by Nubian men who travelled for work, it is increasingly being learned by Nubian women who have access to school, radio and television. Nubian women are working outside the home in increasing numbers.

During the 1973 Arab–Israeli War, Egypt employed Nubian people as codetalkers.

Culture

Nubians have developed a common identity, which has been celebrated in poetry, novels, music and storytelling.

Nubians in modern Sudan include the Danagla around Dongola Reach, the Mahas from the Third Cataract to Wadi Halfa, and the Sikurta around Aswan. These Nubians write using their own script. They also practice scarification: Mahas men and women have three scars on each cheek, while the Danaqla wear these scars on their temples. Younger generations appear to be abandoning this custom.

Nubia's ancient cultural development was influenced by its geography. It is sometimes divided into Upper Nubia and Lower Nubia. Upper Nubia was where the ancient Kingdom of Napata (the Kush) was located. Lower Nubia has been called "the corridor to Africa", where there was contact and cultural exchange between Nubians, Egyptians, Greeks, Assyrians, Romans, and Arabs. Lower Nubia was also where the Kingdom of Meroe flourished. The languages spoken by modern Nubians are based on ancient Sudanic dialects. From north to south, they are: Kenuz, Fadicha (Matoki), Sukkot, Mahas, Danagla.

Kerma, Nepata and Meroe were Nubia's largest population centres. The rich agricultural lands of Nubia supported these cities. Ancient Egyptian rulers sought control of Nubia's wealth, including gold, and the important trade routes within its territories. Nubia's trade links with Egypt led to Egypt's domination over Nubia during the New Kingdom period. The emergence of the Kingdom of Meroe in the 8th century BC led to Egypt being under the control of Nubian rulers for a century, although they preserved many Egyptian cultural traditions. Nubian kings were considered pious scholars and patrons of the arts, copying ancient Egyptian texts and even restoring some Egyptian cultural practices. After this, Egypt's influence declined greatly. Meroe became the centre of power for Nubia and cultural links with other parts of Africa gained greater influence.

Religion
Today, Nubians practice Islam. To a certain degree, Nubian religious practices involve a syncretism of Islam and traditional folk beliefs. In ancient times, Nubians practiced a mixture of traditional religion and Egyptian religion. Prior to the spread of Islam, many Nubians practiced Christianity.

Beginning in the eighth century, Islam arrived in Nubia, though Christians and Muslims (primarily Arab merchants at this period) lived peacefully together. Over time, the Nubians gradually converted to Islam, beginning with the Nubian elite. Islam was mainly spread via Sufi preachers that settled in Nubia in the late 14th century onwards. By the sixteenth century, most of the Nubians were Muslim.

Ancient Nepata was an important religious centre in Nubia. It was the location of Gebel Barkal, a massive sandstone hill resembling a rearing cobra in the eyes of the ancient inhabitants. Egyptian priests declared it to be the home of the ancient deity Amun, further enhancing Nepata as an ancient religious site. This was the case for both Egyptians and Nubians. Egyptian and Nubian deities alike were worshipped in Nubia for 2,500 years, even while Nubia was under the control of the New Kingdom of Egypt. Nubian kings and queens were buried near Gebel Barkal, in pyramids as the Egyptian pharaohs were. Nubian pyramids were built at Gebel Barkal, at Nuri (across the Nile from Gebel Barkal), at El Kerru, and at Meroe, south of Gebel Barkal.

Architecture

Modern Nubian architecture in Sudan is distinctive, and typically features a large courtyard surrounded by a high wall. A large, ornately decorated gate, preferably facing the Nile, dominates the property. Brightly colored stucco is often decorated with symbols connected with the family inside, or popular motifs such as geometric patterns, palm trees, or the evil eye that wards away bad luck.

Nubians invented the Nubian vault, a type of curved surface forming a vaulted structure.

Genetics

Autosomal DNA has been extensively studied in recent years, and some of the findings are as follows:

 Babiker, H.M., Schlebusch, C.M., Hassan, H.Y. et al. (2011) revealed that individuals from northern Sudan clustered with those from Egypt, while individuals from South Sudan clustered with those from Karamoja (Uganda). They conclude that "the similarity of the Nubian and Egyptian populations suggest that migration, potentially bidirectional, occurred along the Nile river Valley, which is consistent with the historical evidence for long-term interactions between Egypt and Nubia.

 Dobon et al. (2015) identified an ancestral autosomal component of West Eurasian origin that is common to many Sudanese Arabs, Nubians and Afroasiatic-speaking populations in the region. Nubians were found to be genetically modelled similar to their Cushitic and Semitic (Afro-Asiatic) neighbors (such as the Beja, Sudanese Arabs, and Ethiopians) rather than to other Nilo-Saharan speakers who lack this Middle Eastern/North African influence. The study showed that these populations formed a "North-East cluster", which included Northern Sudanese. This may be explained by the aforementioned groups being a mixture of a population similar to Modern Coptic Egyptians, and an ancestral Southern African one.

 Hollfelder et al. (2017) analysed various populations in Sudan and observed close autosomal affinities between their Nubian and Sudanese Arab samples. The authors concluded that the "Nubians can be seen as a group with substantial genetic material relating to Nilotes that later received much gene-flow from Eurasians and East Africans. The strongest admixture came from Eurasian populations and was likely quite extensive: 39.41%-47.73%."

 Sirak et al. (2015) analysed the DNA of a Christian-period inhabitant of Kulubnarti in northern Nubia near the Egyptian border. They found that this individual was most closely related to Middle Eastern populations. Further excavations of two Early Christian period (AD 550-800) cemeteries at Kulubnarti, one located on the mainland and the other on an island, revealed the existence of two ancestrally and socioeconomically distinct local populations. Preliminary results, including mitochondrial haplogroup analysis, suggests there may be substantial differences in the genetic composition between the two communities, with 70% of individuals from the island cemetery demonstrating African-based haplogroups (L2, L1, and L5), compared to only 36.4% of mainlanders, who instead show an increased prevalence of European and Near Eastern haplogroups (including K1, H, I5, and U1).

 In 2018, Carina M. Schlebusch and Mattias Jakobsson in the Annual Review of Genomics and Human Genetics, found that Nilotic populations from South Sudan (e.g. Dinka, Nuer and Shilluk) remained isolated and received little to no geneflow from Eurasians, West African Bantu-speaking farmers, and other surrounding groups. In contrast, Nubians and Arabs in the north showed admixture from Western Eurasian populations. The population structure analysis and inferred ancestry showed that "the Nubian, Arab, and Beja populations of northeastern Africa roughly display equal admixture fractions from a local northeastern African gene pool (similar to the Nilotic component) and an incoming Eurasian migrant component."

Christian-Era DNA
Sirak et al. 2021 obtained and analyzed the whole genomes of 66 individuals from the site of Kulubnarti situated between the 2nd and 3rd cataract and dated to the Christian period between 650 and 1000 CE. The samples were obtained from two cemeteries, R and S. Grave materials between the two cemeteries did not differ, but physical analyses of the remains found differences in morbidity and mortality indicating that the R cemetery individuals were of a higher social class than the cemetery S individuals. The study analyzed the data they obtained along with other published ancient and modern samples from Africa and West Eurasia. The genetic profile of the sampled Christian-era Nubians was found to be a mixture between West Eurasian and Sub Saharan Dinka-related ancestries. The samples were estimated to have approximately 60% West Eurasian related ancestry that likely came from ancient Egyptians but ultimately resembles that found in Bronze or Iron Age Levantines. They also carried approximately 40% Dinka-related ancestry. The study commented that the results reflect deep biological connections among the populations of the Nile Valley and further confirm the presence of West Eurasian ancestry in the Nile valley prior to Arab migrations.

The two cemeteries showed minimal differences in their West Eurasian/Dinka ancestry proportions, formed a genetic clade with each other in relation to other populations, and had a small FST value of 0.0013 reflecting a small genetic distance. These findings in addition to multiple cross cemetery relatives that the analyses have revealed indicate that people of both the R and S cemeteries were part of the same population despite the archaeological and anthropological differences between the two burials showing social stratification.

The study found some difference in Y haplogroups profiles between the two cemeteries with the S cemetery having more west Asian clades. the difference was found to be insignificant, and the study viewed it as likely to be a statistical fluctuation and not evidence of heterogeneity among males from the two cemeteries.

Regarding modern Nubians, despite their superficial resemblance to the Kulubnarti Nubians on the PCA, they were not found to be descended from Kulubnarti Nubians without additional later admixtures. modern Nubians were found to have an increase in Sub-Saharan ancestry along with a change in their west Eurasian ancestry from that found in the ancient samples.

Notable Nubians

 Alara of Kush, founder of the Twenty-fifth Dynasty of Egypt
 Mentuhotep II, the sixth ruler of the Eleventh Dynasty. United Egypt and established the Middle Kingdom of Egypt
 Amenemhat I, founder of the Twelfth Dynasty. Many scholars in recent years have argued that his mother was of Nubian descent.
 Taharqa, Pharaoh of the Twenty-fifth Dynasty.
 Amanitore, Kandake (queen) of the Kingdom of Kush centered on Meroë
 Silko, 6th century King of the Noubades and all of the Ethiopians, associated with the Christianization of Nubia
 Qalidurut, 7th century King of Makuria, defeated the Arab Muslim invasion at the First Battle of Dongola and Second Battle of Dongola, signed the Baqt
 Merkourios, 8th century King of Dotawo, unifier of Nobatia and Makuria, referred to as the New Constantine by John the Deacon
 Kyriakos of Makuria, 8th Century King of Makuria. Invaded Egypt to rescue Patriarch of Alexandria Michael
 Rafael of Makuria, 10 century Nubian King of Makuria. Built the famous " Red Palace" at Dongola
 Salomo of Makuria, 11th century King of Dotawo. United the kingdom of Dongola and Soba
 Moses Georgios of Makuria, 12th century "king of Alodia, Makuria, Nobadia, Dalmatia[g] and Axioma", mostly known for his conflict with Ayyubids
 Georgios I of Makuria, King of Makuria, Son of Zacharias III Renegotiated the Baqt with the Abassids
 Jaafar an-Nimeiry, former Sudanese president.
 Khalil Farah, 20th century Sudanese Nubian musician. 
 Mohamed Mounir, Egyptian Nubian Singer, known as "The King"
 Mohammed Wardi, Sudanese Nubian singer
 Mo Ibrahim, Sudanese-British mobile communications entrepreneur and billionaire
 Hamza El Din, Singer and musicologist
 Khalil Kalfat, Literary critic, political and economic thinker and writer
 Abdallah Khalil, Ex-Sudanese Prime Minister, co-founder of the White Flag League, co-founder and ex-general secretary of the Umma Party
 Mohamed Hussein Tantawi Soliman, Egyptian Field Marshal and statesman, commander-in-chief of the Egyptian Armed Forces, de facto head of state of Egypt
 Muhammad Ahmad, 19th century Sufi sheikh and revolutionary leader of the Ansar
 Osama Abdul Latif, a Sudanese businessman, chairman of DAL Group 
 Idris Ali, Egyptian novelist and short story writer 
 Fathi Hassan, Painter
 Ali Ghazal, Egyptian footballer
 Ali Hassan Kuban, Singer
 Taha Abdelmagid
 Abdel Raouf
 Amjad Ismail
 Haitham Mustafa
 Mazin Mohamedein
 Musab Ahmed
 Mohamed Homos

See also
 Barabra is an old ethnographical term for the Nubian peoples of Sudan and southern Egypt.
 Nubian wig worn by the affluent society of ancient Egypt
 Aethiopia is an ancient Greek geographical term which referred to the regions of Sudan and areas south of the Sahara desert.

References

Inline citations

General references 

 

 
 
 Black Pharaohs - National Geographic Feb 2008

External links

 
 Nubian people history
 Johanna Granville "Nubians of Egypt and Sudan Past and Present"
 Nubians  by Abubakr Sidahmed
 Nubians Use Hip-hop to Preserve Culture - Sudan Tribune
 "The Forgotten Minorities: Egypt's Nubians and Amazigh in the Amended Constitution"

Nubia
Indigenous peoples of East Africa
Indigenous peoples of North Africa
Ethnic groups in Sudan
Ethnic groups in Egypt
Ethnic groups in the Arab world
Sudanese people of Nubian descent
Ancient peoples